Yakusoku may refer to:
 The Rendezvous (1972 film), or Yakusoku, a Japanese film
 Yakusoku (Lead song), 2015
 Yakusoku (Eir Aoi song), 2018